Spatial tense is a grammatical category that refers to the indication of the place of an event, analogue to the use of the more common category of grammatical tense to indicate the time of an event.

The term "spatial tense" is mostly employed in the grammar of Lojban (an artificial language). In Lojban, temporal and spatial tense are treated alike. When present, they are marked by particles that may appear in different parts of the sentence according to the emphasis the speaker wants to convey. The spatial tense morphemes show position and/or distance relative to the speaker. The difference between spatial tense and the use of words and phrases like "here", "to the left", "at a short distance ahead", etc., lies in the fact that these phrases are simply lexical items, while spatial tense is a grammatical category of the verb (more properly speaking, the predicate).

Grammatical tenses